Mohammad Reza Akhbari (born 15 February 1993) is an Iranian footballer who plays for Iranian club Tractor as a goalkeeper. He is a member of the Iranian national team.

Club career

Saipa
He started his career with Saipa from youth levels. Akhbari is also one of the unknown young players which was presented to the Iranian Football by coach Engin Firat. He made his debut for Saipa in last fixture of 2013–14 Iran Pro League against Saba Qom as a starter.

Tractor
Akhbari joined Tractor for a two–year period to complete his conscription. He became the starting goalkeeper for Tractor and led them to the Round of 16 of the 2016 AFC Champions League. Akhbari's good performances with Tractor earned him a national team call up.

Return to Tractor
On 6 January 2019, Akhbari signed a four years contract with  Tractor. He has been given the title of "Kartal" by Tractor fans since 2015.

Club career statistics

International career

Youth

Akhbari was invited to the Iran U23 preliminary camp by Nelo Vingada to preparation for Incheon 2014 and 2016 AFC U-22 Championship (Summer Olympic qualification). He was named in Iran U23 final list for Incheon 2014.

Senior
He was invited to Iranian national team for the first time on 12 March 2016 by Carlos Queiroz for two upcoming matches against India and Oman during 2018 FIFA World Cup qualification. However, he did not play. He played his first match for the senior team on 8 June 2016 in a friendly with Kyrgyzstan, coming as a substitute of first choice Alireza Haghighi in the second half.

Honours

Club 
Tractor
Hazfi Cup (1): 2019–20

National 
 Iran U-23
 WAFF U-23 Championship : 2015

References
4. اخباری مزد درخشش را گرفت Retrieved in Persian www.farsnews.ir خبرگزاری فارس

5. بازگشت اخباری به تمرین تیم ملی(عکس Retrieved in Persian www.varzesh3.com

6. بازگشت اخباری از اردوی تیم ملی برای دیدار با ماشین سازی Retrieved in Persian www.tasnimnews.com خبرگزاری تسنیم

7. ویدیو: تمجید AFC از عملکرد اخباری در لیگ قهرمانان آسیا Retrieved in Persian www.ilna.news خبرگزاری ایلنا

8. Sharjah vs. Tractor Retrieved int.soccerway.com 29 April 2021

9. محمدرضا اخباری برترین بازیکن دیدار تراکتور با نیروی هوای عراق شد Retrieved in Persian www.mehrnews.com خبرگزاری مهر

10. Biography Mohammad Reza Akhbari Retrieved in Persian

11. اخباری: هیچ چیز از پیش معلوم نیست/ بازی دوستانه برای هماهنگی بیشتر مهم است Retrieved in Persian www.isna.ir خبرگزاری دانشجویان ایران ایسنا

12. بینی محمدرضا اخباری شکست Retrieved in Persian www.yjc.news باشگاه خبرنگاران جوان

13. Mohammad Reza Akhbari Wants to Make A Dent in ACL Retrieved in Persian www.tasnimnews.com 2021/4/13 خبرگزاری تسنیم

External links
 Mohammad Reza Akhbari at PersianLeague.com
 
 
 
 

1993 births
Living people
Iranian footballers
Persian Gulf Pro League players
Saipa F.C. players
Tractor S.C. players
Sportspeople from Tehran
Association football goalkeepers
Footballers at the 2014 Asian Games
Sportspeople from Isfahan
Asian Games competitors for Iran